The 2011 Supercupa României was the 13th edition of Romania's season opener cup competition.

Match

Details

References

External links
Romania - List of Super Cup Finals, RSSSF.com

Super
Supercupa României
FC Steaua București matches